Kazakhstan competed at the 2014 Winter Olympics in Sochi, Russia, from 7 to 23 February 2014. Kazakhstan's team consisted of 52 athletes competing in 11 sports, an increase of 14 athletes from four years prior.

Medalists

Alpine skiing 

According to the final quota allocation released on 20 January 2014, Kazakhstan had four athletes in qualification position. Lyudmila Fedotova was selected to compete but she did not participate in any of her scheduled events.

Biathlon 

Based on their performance at the 2012 and 2013 Biathlon World Championships, Kazakhstan qualified 5 men and 5 women.

Men

Women

Mixed

Cross-country skiing 

According to the final quota allocation released on 20 January 2014, Kazakhstan had eleven athletes in qualification position.

Distance
Men

Women

Sprint
Men

Women

Figure skating 

By finishing with the silver medal at the 2013 World Figure Skating Championships, Denis Ten managed to qualify two skaters for Kazakhstan. In 2018, Ten was stabbed to death in Almaty by two carjackers.

Freestyle skiing 

Aerials

Moguls

Luge 

Kazakhstan qualified a place in the women's singles after receiving a reallocation spot (the next country not yet represented in each event) during the 2013–14 Luge World Cup.

Short track speed skating 

Men

Women

Qualification legend: ADV – Advanced due to being impeded by another skater; FA – Qualify to medal round; FB – Qualify to consolation round

Ski jumping 

According to the final quota allocation released on 20 January 2014, Kazakhstan had one athlete in qualification position.

Snowboarding 

According to the final quota allocation released on 20 January 2014, Kazakhstan had one athlete in qualification position.

Alpine

Speed skating 

Based on the results from the fall World Cups during the 2013–14 ISU Speed Skating World Cup season, Kazakhstan earned the following start quotas:

Men

Women

See also
Kazakhstan at the 2014 Summer Youth Olympics
Kazakhstan at the 2014 Winter Paralympics

References

External links 
Kazakhstan at the 2014 Winter Olympics

Nations at the 2014 Winter Olympics
2014 Winter Olympics
Olympics